Tone Gazzari (25 February 1912 – 23 July 1996) was a Yugoslav swimmer. He competed in the men's 4 × 200 metre freestyle relay at the 1936 Summer Olympics.

References

1912 births
1996 deaths
Croatian male swimmers
Yugoslav male swimmers
Olympic swimmers of Yugoslavia
Swimmers at the 1936 Summer Olympics
Sportspeople from Split, Croatia
People from the Kingdom of Dalmatia
Burials at Lovrinac Cemetery